Jeanne d'Arc is a concept album by Italian symphonic power metal act Thy Majestie. Released in 2005 on Scarlet Records the album is based around the story of Joan of Arc (also known as Jeanne d'Arc). The album runs through her story beginning with her fate foretold by God, right up to her execution by burning at the stake.

Track listing

References

Thy Majestie albums
Concept albums
2005 albums